Subha Ghosh (born 22 December 2000) is an Indian professional footballer who plays as a forward for Kerala Premier League club Gokulam Kerala Reserves.

Club career

Early career
A product of Mohun Bagan's academy, Ghosh made his competitive debut for the first-team on 17 August 2019 in Bagan's 2019 Durand Cup match against Indian Navy. He started the match as Mohun Bagan won 1–0. Ghosh then made his professional debut for the club on 8 December 2019 in the I-League against Churchill Brothers. He came on as a 71st minute substitute for Nongdamba Naorem and scored his first professional goal in the 90th minute as Mohun Bagan was defeated 2–4. In the next match, Ghosh scored his second career goal against TRAU. He came off the bench as a substitute for V.P. Suhair and scored Bagan's fourth goal in the first minute of stoppage time as they won 4–0.

Ghosh scored his third goal of the season and his career on 14 January 2020 against Punjab. His 88th-minute goal was the equalizer in a 1–1 draw for Mohun Bagan.

Kerala Blasters
On 29 December 2020, Kerala Blasters announced that they have signed Ghosh from ATK Mohun Bagan on a three-year contract. The deal also coordinated with the swap of Nongdamba Naorem, whom ATK Mohun Bagan signed on an undisclosed transfer fee. It was only in February 2021, the All India Football Federation's (AIFF) player status committee deemed Subha Ghosh’ transfer from ATK Mohun Bagan to Kerala Blasters as valid.

East Bengal (loan)
On 31 August 2021, Ghosh joined East Bengal on a season-long deal. He did not get more chances there and left the club after the loan period ended.

Gokulam kerala FC

Then He joined gkfc on a 3 year deal which will keep him up to 2025.

Career statistics

Honours

Club
Mohun Bagan
Calcutta Football League: 2018–19
I-League: 2019–20

References

2000 births
Living people
Footballers from Kolkata
Indian footballers
United SC players
Mohun Bagan AC players
Association football forwards
I-League players
Kerala Blasters FC players
ATK Mohun Bagan FC players
Indian Super League players
East Bengal Club players
Gokulam Kerala FC players